Isabelle Pedersen (born January 27, 1992) is a Norwegian hurdling athlete.  At the 2010 World Junior Championships, she won a gold medal in the 100 metres hurdles.

Career 
At the 2009 World Youth Championships, Pedersen became the world champion in the 100 metres hurdles (76.2 cm) in a time of 13.23. In the semifinals, she ran a 13.20 which was a European record for U18 class until 2011. At the 2010 World Junior Championships, Pedersen won the 100 meters hurdles in a time of 13.30 and in the process set a new Norwegian junior record. She was awarded the Karoline Price the same year.

The following year, Pedersen won silver in the 100 meters hurdles at the 2011 European Junior Championships. She finished in 13.37 and was beaten by Finn Nooralotta Neziri by three hundredths of a second.
In 2011, Pedersen improved her Norwegian junior record with a time of 13.21.

At the 2012 European Championships in Helsinki, she was eliminated in the preliminary round of the 100 metres hurdles with a time of 13.38. During the 2012/13 indoor season, she managed to improve her personal record at the 2013 European Indoor Championships to 8.18 in the 60 metres hurdles and took the semifinals. In the outdoor season, she opened the season promising with a time of 13.06 in a strong tailwind. During the Bislett Games, she improved her personal best time of 13.16 seconds in the approved wind. During friidrettsgalaen in Mannheim, Germany, she further improved her personal record to 13.04. Thus, she qualified at the 2013 World Championships in Moscow (B standard). At the World Championships, she finished 30th overall with a time of 13.43 and did not advance past the heats. In July 2013, Pedersen competed at the 2013 European U23 Championships and won gold in the final with a time of 13.12, ahead of Pole Karolina Kołeczek (13.30).

At the 2014 European Team Championships, Pedersen won the 100 metres hurdles with a time of 13.18. At the 2015 European Indoor Championships, Pedersen finished 5th in the 60 metres hurdles with a time of 7.96.

In 2017, she competed in 60 m hurdles in Meeting de Paris Indoor (9 Feb. 2017) where she got second place with a time of 8.02". She also competed in Karlsruhe indoor meeting where she raced in 60 m hurdles and got the time of 7.98" (4 Feb. 2017).  In Feb. 2017 Isabelle Pedersen competed in Müller Indoor Grand Prix in Birmingham and she raced for 60m hurdles with a time of 8.22" in heats but did not reach finals. Isabelle Pedersen participated in 2017 European Athletics Indoor Championships in Belgrade and competed on 3 March 2017 and reached the finals for 60m hurdles and was placed 5th with a time of 8.01".

In April 2017 Isabelle Pedersen competed in 100 m hurdles event in Columbia, USA and finished 2nd place with a season best of 12.89 seconds (wind +1.2 m/s), which qualified her for London 2017 World Championships in Athletics.

Competition record

References

External links
 

1992 births
Living people
Sportspeople from Bergen
Norwegian female hurdlers
World Athletics Championships athletes for Norway
Athletes (track and field) at the 2016 Summer Olympics
Olympic athletes of Norway
Norwegian Athletics Championships winners